You Make My Day is the fifth extended play by South Korean boy group Seventeen. It was released on July 16, 2018, by Pledis Entertainment. The album has six tracks, including the single "Oh My!".

Track listing

Charts

Weekly charts

Year-end charts

References

Seventeen (South Korean band) EPs
2018 EPs
Korean-language EPs
Pop albums by South Korean artists
Hybe Corporation EPs